MV Tegemeo is a ferry operating on Lake Victoria in Tanzania. Its name in the Swahili language could either mean expectation or support.

History
It was officially launched by Vice President Mohamed Gharib Bilal on 27 September 2014.

References

External links
 Images of the launch ceremony

2014 ships
Ferries of Tanzania